Wang Weiliang (born 11 October 1987) is a Singaporean actor and singer. A getai performer-turned-actor, Wang has become a local celebrity after the successes of Ah Boys to Men movie series by director Jack Neo.

Personal life
At 14, he dropped out of Montfort Secondary School to help with his family's household expenditure. A former teen gangster, his previous jobs included pasar malam hawker and alarm clock salesman.

He served national service as a storeman in 4 SIR (4th Battalion, Singapore Infantry Regiment).

The reason Wang is on stage is his mother. He said: "My mother is like my girlfriend. We are very close. I'm still standing on stage today because of the pride I see on her face. I relish it. I fell wayward for 10 years, and she took care of me all those 10 years. I told myself I would never break her heart again because, no matter what I'd done wrong in the past, my mother would still say, 'you are still my son.'"

Career
Speaking predominantly in Hokkien and Mandarin, Wang debuted as a getai singer in 2009 before trying his hand as a getai host in 2011, after local veteran getai performer and mentor Wang Lei gave him a stage costume.

In 2012, he was picked to star in Ah Boys to Men as the street smart Bang "Lobang" Lee Onn by director Jack Neo, and has gained popularity and fame due to its success. He also sang the original soundtrack "牵着我" for The Lion Men (2014), another Singaporean movie also directed by Jack Neo.

In 2014, he received rave reviews for reprising his role as the street-smart recruit Bang "Lobang" Lee Onn win the Ah Boys to Men: The Musical.

Filmography

Film

Television series

Variety / Television show

Awards and nominations

Theater

References

External links
  at Fly Entertainment
 
 
 

Living people
1987 births
Singaporean people of Hokkien descent
Singaporean male film actors
Singaporean male television actors